Raymond Gabutti (1908-1985) was a French art director.

Selected filmography
 Three Waltzes (1938)
 Storm Over Asia (1938)
 Crossroads (1938)
 Children of Paradise (1945)
 The Seventh Door (1947)
Judicial Error (1948)
 Emile the African (1949)
 Fantomas Against Fantomas (1949)
 Thirst of Men (1950)
 Captain Ardant (1951)
 Endless Horizons (1953)
 The Lovers of Marianne (1953)
 Royal Affairs in Versailles (1954)
 I'll Get Back to Kandara (1956)
 Anyone Can Kill Me (1957)
 Life Together (1958)
 Leontine (1968)
 A Golden Widow (1969)

References

Bibliography
 Turk, Edward Baron . Child of Paradise: Marcel Carné and the Golden Age of French Cinema. Harvard University Press, 1989.

External links

1908 births
1985 deaths
French art directors
Male actors from Paris